The Basketball Bundesliga 2010–11 was the 45th season of the Basketball Bundesliga (BBL). Prior to the start of the season, a new logo for the league was presented, combined with the motto "Spürst Du das Dribbeln?" ("Do you feel the dribbling?"). The regular season ran from October 1, 2010 through April 23, 2011, and the first round of the playoffs began begin on April 30 and the last match played on June 18.

Teams
All teams of the season 2009–10, which had qualified for the season 2010–11 by sportive means, have been granted a licence for the season 2010–11. BBC Bayreuth and Cuxhaven BasCats of the Pro A division have qualified by sportive means to play in Basketball Bundesliga 2010–11. BBC Bayreuth have received a licence for the BBL. However Cuxhaven BasCats waived their rights for promotion, which resulted in a free slot. The clubs of the BBL decided unanimously to grant a wildcard for this slot to GIANTS Düsseldorf. GIANTS Düsseldorf finished on a relegation position (17th) in the previous season and, because the financial requirements tied to the wildcard could be met, the club has been prevented from relegation.

PO: Playoff; Rel: Relegation; Pro A: Division below BBL; italic type: preliminary

Main round standings

Mitteldeutscher BC and Giants Düsseldorf will be relegated to the Pro A league for the 2011–12 season.

Playoffs

See also
 German champions

References

External links
German League official website 

Basketball Bundesliga seasons
German
1